Rolf "Mackan" Pettersson (27 September 1926 – 9 November 2010) was a Swedish ice hockey and bandy player, who represented Hammarby IF in both sports. He competed in six Ice Hockey World Championships, winning Sweden's first gold medal in 1953.

Athletic career

Ice hockey
Born and raised in Stockholm, Pettersson started to play ice hockey with local club Karlbergs BK where he made his debut in Division 1, the domestic top league. In 1946, he moved to Hammarby IF. Playing as a forward, he got known as a good skater and sniper, initially forming a line with Holger Nurmela and Östen Johansson.

He won the Swedish championship with Hammarby IF in 1951. In total, he played 207 games for the club and scored 115 goals, before leaving in 1961 after 15 seasons. After leaving Hammarby IF, he finished his ice hockey career with Tranebergs SK, playing one season in the lower divisions.

Pettersson made 95 international appearances for the Swedish national team, scoring 22 goals, being part of their roster in six different World Championship tournaments. Most notably, he won Sweden's first gold medal in 1953, as well as winning the silver medal in 1947 and bronze medal in 1954. He also competed in the 1948 Winter Olympics in Garmisch-Partenkirchen, where his country finished in 4th place.

He is a recipient of the honorary award Stora Grabbars Märke, awarded by the Swedish Ice Hockey Association.

Bandy
Starting his bandy career with local clubs IF Ulvarna, Stockholms IF and Minnebergs IK, Pettersson moved to Hammarby IF in 1950. The club reached its first Swedish Championship final in 1957, but lost 1–2 to Örebro SK at Stockholms stadion, in which Pettersson assisted Leif Fredblad who scored the consolation goal for his side. He played ten seasons with Hammarby IF in Allsvenskan, the domestic top tier, and won two caps for the Swedish national team.

Football
In 1949–50, Pettersson also briefly played football with Hammarby IF, making three appearances in Division 3, Sweden's third tier.

References

External links
 

1926 births
2010 deaths
Ice hockey players at the 1948 Winter Olympics
Olympic ice hockey players of Sweden
Ice hockey people from Stockholm
Swedish ice hockey players
Swedish bandy players
Swedish footballers
Hammarby Hockey (1921–2008) players
Hammarby Fotboll players
Hammarby IF Bandy players
Association football forwards